This was the first edition of the tournament.

Janko Tipsarević won the title after defeating Rubén Ramírez Hidalgo 1–6, 7–5, 6–1 in the final.

Seeds

Draw

Finals

Top half

Bottom half

References

 Main Draw
 Qualifying Draw

ZS-Sports China International Challenger - Singles